This is a list of the most translated literary works (including novels, plays, series, collections of poems or short stories, and essays and other forms of literary non-fiction) sorted by the number of languages into which they have been translated. Only translations published by established, independent publishers are taken into account, not people self-publishing translations (real or automatic) via publish-on-demand or on websites, to avoid artificially inflated counts.

See also
List of most translated individual authors
List of best-selling books
Index Translationum

References

External links
Translated works' and authors' database at the UNESCO website
The Most Translated Authors in the World
'World Map of the Most Translated Books by Country', infographic prepared by Preply (full list of sources included) 

Translation-related lists
Literature records